Zhigalovsky District is an administrative district, one of the thirty-three in Irkutsk Oblast, Russia. Municipally, it is incorporated as Zhigalovsky Municipal District. Its administrative center is the urban locality (a work settlement) of Zhigalovo. Population:  10,408 (2002 Census);  The population of Zhigalovo accounts for 57.5% of the district's total population.

Geography 
The district is located in the Lena-Angara Plateau area. The Ilga and Tutura, tributaries of the Lena River, flow across it.

Some of the settlements of the district are Ust-Ilga (Усть-Илга), Konstantinovka (Константиновка), Lukinovo (Лукиново), Bachai (Бачай), Zakharova (Захарова), Timoshino (Тимошино), Butyrina (Бутырина), Kaidakan (Кайдакан), Chikan (Чикан), Tutura (Тутура), Kelora (Келора), Chichek (Чичек), Kachen (Качень), Rudovka (Рудовка), Znamenka (Знаменка), and Nizhnyaya Sloboda (Нижняя Слобода).

References

Notes

Sources

External links